Lance Michael Pendleton (born September 10, 1983) is an American former professional baseball pitcher. He played in Major League Baseball (MLB) with the New York Yankees and Houston Astros.

Early life
Pendleton was born to David and Terry Pendleton. Pendleton attended Kingwood High School from 1999 to 2002, where he played for the Kingwood Mustangs. Pendleton led his team in both earned run average (ERA) and batting average at times.

College career
Pendleton attended Rice University, where he played for the Rice Owls baseball team. In 2003, Pendleton was a member of the College World Series champions, the first victory for Rice in its fourth tournament appearance. In 2003, he played collegiate summer baseball with the Wareham Gatemen of the Cape Cod Baseball League. He rounded out his college career in 2005 with a 5-3 record and a 3.7 ERA.

Professional career
Pendleton was selected in the fourth round (139th overall) of the 2005 Major League Baseball Draft by the New York Yankees. Shortly afterwards, Lance elected to undergo Tommy John surgery. Returning to the Yankees farm club in 2007, Lance played for 6 teams in 5 years, compiling a 32–22 record and a 3.39 cumulative ERA.

In the 2010 Rule 5 Draft, Pendleton was taken by the Houston Astros. He was returned to the Yankees on March 27, 2011. He was promoted to the majors on April 15, when Phil Hughes was placed on the disabled list.

Pendleton was designated for assignment by the Yankees and claimed off waivers by the Astros in September 2011. Allowing nine runs in  innings with the Astros, they outrighted him to the minor leagues following the season. As this was the second time he was outrighted, he had the option to opt for free agency, which he exercised. The Astros signed Pendleton to a minor league contract with an invitation to spring training for the 2012 season. On March 30, 2012 Pendleton was released by the Houston Astros. He signed a minor league deal with the Tampa Bay Rays on April 18 and spent the entire 2012 season pitching for the AAA Durham Bulls.

References

External links

Living people
1983 births
Baseball players from Texas
Rice Owls baseball players
Staten Island Yankees players
Gulf Coast Yankees players
Charleston RiverDogs players
Tampa Yankees players
Trenton Thunder players
Scranton/Wilkes-Barre Yankees players
New York Yankees players
Houston Astros players
Major League Baseball pitchers
Durham Bulls players
Wareham Gatemen players